Shahdad District is a district (bakhsh) in Kerman County, Kerman Province, Iran. At the 2006 census, its population was 15,333, in 3,742 families.  The district has two cities: Shahdad and Anduhjerd.  The district has three rural districts (dehestan): Anduhjerd Rural District, Sirch Rural District, and Takab Rural District.

References 

Kerman County
Districts of Kerman Province